Ingeborg Cook (born Alma Ingeborg Cook, May 13, 1915 – December 27, 2003) was a Norwegian actress and singer.

Cook was born in Galveston, Texas, the daughter of Axel Brynjulf Christensen Cook (1886–1927) and Ingeborg Alma Cook (née Isaksen, 1888–1982). She left the United States for Norway when she was one year old. She married Victor Borg. Cook debuted as an actress in the film Tørres Snørtevold in 1940. She played a long series of roles both in film and on television. Her last role as an actress was in the sitcom Karl & Co in 1999 at the age of 84. Ingeborg Cook was the sister of the bass player and band leader Frank Cook.

Filmography
 1940: Tørres Snørtevold
 1942: Jeg drepte!
 1946: Englandsfarere
 1947: Sankt Hans fest
 1959: 5 loddrett
 1960: Veien tilbake
 1965: Hjelp – vi får leilighet!
 1966: Før frostnettene
 1969: The Olsen Gang (Norwegian: Operasjon Egon)
 1970: Døden i gatene
 1972: Norske byggeklosser
 1972: Olsenbanden tar gull
 1979: Lucie
 1979: To Norway, Home of Giants
 1992: Ute av drift!
 1996: Markus og Diana
 1998: Karl & Co
 1999: Karl & Co

References

External links

Ingeborg Cook at the Swedish Film Database

20th-century Norwegian actresses
20th-century Norwegian women singers
20th-century Norwegian singers
Burials at Vestre gravlund
1915 births
2003 deaths